Gąbin  is a village in the administrative district of Gmina Szubin, within Nakło County, Kuyavian-Pomeranian Voivodeship, in north-central Poland.

The village has a population of 248.

References

Villages in Nakło County